The Archeparchy of Amida (or Diyarbakır) is the Chaldaean rite Catholic diocese of Turkey, with its archiepiscopal see in Diyarbakır, Turkey.

History 
It was first established in 1531 as the Chaldean Diocese of Amid(a). In June 1915 it gained territory from the suppressed Chaldean Catholic Diocese of Seert (now a titular see).

After the Assyrian genocide it was left vacant and lapsed after the death of its archbishop in 1923. Nevertheless, the size of the diocese increased on 3 July 1957 from the suppression of the Chaldean Catholic Diocese of Gazireh.

On 3 January 1966, it was promoted to an Archeparchy (Eastern Catholic archdiocese) and a new archbishop was ordained to fill the role. Since that point, it has been the sole Chaldean diocese in Turkey, and in effect resides over all of Turkeys Chaldeans.

Its episcopal see was historically located at St. Mary's Cathedral in Diyarbekir, and it still is in modern day, but the archeparch (or archbishop) now resides in Beyoğlu, Istanbul, where the Chaldean community use Holy Trinity Greek Catholic Cathedral, formerly for the Greek Byzantine Catholics, as their church.

Demographics
The most recent data indicates that the Chaldean population is 7,640, up from 6,000 in 1980.

Statistics

1980	6,000

1990	1,400

1999	5,000

2001	5,100

2002	5,100

2003	4,800

2004	5,925

2006	4,226

2009	6,219

2013	7,640

Episcopal incumbents 
(incomplete)

 Eparchs 
 ...

 Archeparchs 
 Gabriel Batta (1966.01.03 – 1977.03.07)
 Paul Karatas (1977.03.07 – 2005.01.16)
 ''apostolic administrator François Yakan (2007 - 2018.12.22)
 Ramzi Garmou (since 2018.12.23)

The Archeparch (archbishop) is immediately subject to the Patriarch of Babylon, who heads the Chaldean Catholic Church.

See also
 Catholic Church in Turkey

References

External links 
 GCatholic.org, with incumbent biography links
 Catholic Hierarchy.org entry

Chaldean Catholic dioceses
Diyarbakır Province
Southeastern Anatolia Region